The 2007–08 Vermont Catamounts season was their third in Hockey East. Led by head coach Tim Bothwell, the Catamounts had 8 victories, compared to 25 defeats and 1 tie. Their conference record was 4 victories, 16 defeats and 1 tie.

Regular season
October 6, 2007: Kate Lesniak scored a hat trick vs. the Sacred Heart Pioneers women's ice hockey program.

Schedule

Awards and honors

Hockey East All-Academic Team

Team records
Team Single Season Record, Most Shorthanded Goals, (5), 2007–08
Individual Single Season Record, Most Shorthanded Goals, .2, Brittany Nelson (2007–08)

References

Vermont Catamounts Women's Ice Hockey Season, 2007-08
Vermont Catamounts women's ice hockey seasons
Cata
Cata